Dinner with Don directed by Bobby Bauer, is an American web television talk show starring Don Rickles interviewed by a group host of celebrities. The series was produced by Stamper Lumber Company and the first production from AARP Studios and the final project of Rickles' career. It premiered on September 25, 2017 on YouTube.

Premise
Dinner with Don features "Rickles dining with friends and fellow comedians at some of his favorite LA-area restaurants, with a guest list that includes Billy Crystal, Zach Galifianakis, Robert De Niro, Jimmy Kimmel, Amy Poehler, Vince Vaughn, Paul Rudd, Marisa Tomei and Martin Scorsese. The series also featured archives and footage from guest’s personal archives whenever possible."

Production

Development
On March 20, 2017, it was announced that AARP had formed their own production company called AARP Studios. It was further reported that the company's first production would be a series created by C.Scot Cru, Bobby Bauer, Tony Oppedisano, Michael Guarnera, starring comedian Don Rickles entitled Dinner with Don. The first and second season consists of thirteen episodes and feature guests including Billy Crystal, Robert De Niro, Jimmy Kimmel, Amy Poehler, Vince Vaughn, Paul Rudd, Marisa Tomei, and Martin Scorsese. The series was set to be executive produced by C. Scot Cru, Robert Bauer and Tony Oppedisano. Presenting production company was Stamper Lumber Company, in association with Winbrook Entertainment, and Wynnefield Productions.

Filming
Principal photography for the series took place in Los Angeles, California at various restaurants including Craig's, Dan Tana's, Madeo, and the Palm.

Marketing
Following Rickles' death, AARP released the first footage from the series.

Episodes

Reception

Awards and nominations

References

External links

2010s American television talk shows
English-language television shows